The 2009 Pan American Aerobic Gymnastics Championships were held in Morelos, Mexico. The competition was organized by the Mexican Gymnastics Federation.

Medalists

References

2009 in gymnastics
International gymnastics competitions hosted by Mexico
2009 in Mexican sports
Pan American Gymnastics Championships